The 1975 Clemson Tigers football team was an American football team that represented Clemson University in the Atlantic Coast Conference (ACC) during the 1975 NCAA Division I football season. In its fifth season under head coach Red Parker, the team compiled a 2–9 record (2–3 against conference opponents), finished fifth in the ACC, and was outscored by a total of 381 to 177. The team played its home games at Memorial Stadium in Clemson, South Carolina.

Bennie Cunningham, Neal Jetton, Dennis Smith, and Jimmy Williamson were the team captains. The team's statistical leaders included quarterback Willie Jordan with 728 passing yards, running back Ken Callicutt with 572 rushing yards, Craig Brantley with 475 receiving yards, and Mike O'Cain with 36 points (6 touchdowns).

Schedule

References

Clemson
Clemson Tigers football seasons
Clemson Tigers football